TMNT is a 2007 computer-animated superhero film written and directed by Kevin Munroe (in his feature directorial debut). It is the first animated film in the Teenage Mutant Ninja Turtles franchise and a standalone sequel of Teenage Mutant Ninja Turtles III (1993). The film features an ensemble voice cast featuring Chris Evans, Sarah Michelle Gellar, Mako, Kevin Smith, Patrick Stewart, and Ziyi Zhang with narration by Laurence Fishburne. The story sees the four Turtles —— Leonardo, Raphael, Donatello, and Michelangelo (voiced respectively by James Arnold Taylor, Nolan North, Mitchell Whitfield, and Mikey Kelley) —— having grown apart after their final defeat of their arch-enemy, the Shredder, but are set to reunite and overcome their faults to save the world from evil ancient creatures.

TMNT was released theatrically in the United States on March 23, 2007, by Warner Bros. Pictures, and internationally by The Weinstein Company (though The Weinstein Company did not handle the Japanese home video distribution rights to the film). It was the first of two films produced by Imagi Animation Studios. The film received mixed reviews from critics, but it was a small commercial success, grossing $95 million worldwide against a budget of $34 million. Planned sequels were cancelled after Viacom acquired the franchise in 2009, rebooting the film series with the live-action Teenage Mutant Ninja Turtles in 2014.

Plot
In ancient times, warlord Yaotl opens a portal into a parallel universe that grants him immortality and petrifies his four generals. The portal also releases thirteen immortal monsters that destroy his army and his enemies while becoming famous mythical monsters as centuries pass.

In the present, the Teenage Mutant Ninja Turtles grow apart after defeating the Shredder. For training, Master Splinter sends Leonardo to Central America, where he becomes the protector of a village. Donatello works as an IT specialist, Michelangelo works as a birthday party entertainer named "Cowabunga Carl", and Raphael continues to fight crime as a masked vigilante known as the Nightwatcher, which he keeps a secret. The Turtles' old friend April O'Neil now operates a shipping company that acquires relics for collectors, assisted by her boyfriend, Casey Jones.

After traveling to Central America for work, April tells Leo his brothers have drifted apart. She then returns to New York City with a statue for wealthy tycoon Max Winters. Winters hires Shredder's former second-in-command, Karai and her ninja Foot Clan to search the city for the thirteen monsters before the portal opens again. Casey figures out Raph's double identity and joins him in hunting criminals. Winters, who is actually Yaotl, reanimates his four stone generals using technology created by his company.

Leo returns to the Turtles' sewer lair, reuniting with his family. Splinter forbids them from fighting crime until they can act as a team again. While training, the Turtles encounter one of the thirteen beasts, Bigfoot. They engage Bigfoot, disobeying Splinter's orders, and come into conflict with the Foot Clan in the process. While the Turtles and ninja fight, a fleeing Bigfoot is captured by the generals. The next day, Splinter admonishes his sons for their disobedience. Raphael later visits Casey, and they encounter Vampire Succubor, another one of the monsters. They witness its capture by the Foot and the Stone Generals but are spotted. Despite a successful escape, Raph is rendered unconscious. Casey and April take care of Raph and call the other Turtles for help. Together, they figure out the identities of Yaotl and his generals. After being revived, Raph suggests they pursue Yaotl, but Leonardo refuses to act until Splinter gives his permission. Raph decides to investigate alone.

Donatello discovers the next portal will open over Winters' tower, and Splinter tells Leonardo they need Raphael. Meanwhile, Yaotl reveals that he wishes to turn his generals back into humans and break the curse that keeps them alive. The generals conspire to betray Yaotl, wanting to remain immortal. As the Nightwatcher, Raph patrols the city. Leo, not recognizing his brother, pursues the Nightwatcher, believing him to be just a regular thug. In the ensuing fight, Leo discovers that the Nightwatcher's identity and Raph breaks his swords. After almost killing his brother, Raphael flees in a fit of guilt and shame. The generals seize a weakened Leo, intending to substitute him for the thirteenth beast, and Raph decides to make amends by rescuing Leo. As the portal opens, Yaotl discovers his generals' treachery, while Splinter and the Turtles, accompanied by Casey and April, fight their way through a Foot Clan cordon and breach the tower.

Refusing to betray Yaotl, Karai and the Foot Clan work together with April and Casey, searching for the final monster, the Sea Monster, while the Turtles fight the generals. April, Casey, and Karai arrive at the tower with the Sea Monster, which crashes into the Generals, dragging them into the portal before it closes. Karai warns them to enjoy their victory while it lasts, cryptically saying they will soon contend with faces from their past before vanishing. A now-mortal Yaotl thanks the heroes for fulfilling his wish and dissipates into the afterlife. As they return to their roles as the shadowy guardians of New York City, Raph says that the Turtles will always be brothers.

Voice cast
 Chris Evans as Casey Jones, April's boyfriend and a friend of the turtles; who still engages in crime-fighting.
 Sarah Michelle Gellar as April O'Neil: a young, virtuous archaeologist and friend of the Turtles owning a shipping company.
 Mako Iwamatsu and Greg Baldwin as Splinter, a mutant rat; who is the turtles' father and sensei.
 Kevin Smith as an unnamed cook at a diner where Nightwatcher fights the Jersey Devil.
 Patrick Stewart as Max Winters, a businessman; who is really the immortal warlord Yaotl; who desires to be mortal again and to do amends for his past errors.
 Ziyi Zhang as Karai, the Shredder's former second-in-command and the new leader of the Foot Clan.
 Laurence Fishburne as the Narrator.
 Nolan North as Raphael, the hot-headed brother; who has been secretly operating as the vigilante Nightwatcher.
 James Arnold Taylor as Leonardo, the leader of the group; who has been away training in Central America.
 Mikey Kelley as Michelangelo, the light-hearted and carefree brother, who has been operating as a birthday entertainer, "Cowabunga Carl". 
 Mitchell Whitfield as Donatello, the genius brother; who has been operating as an IT tech support.
 John DiMaggio as Colonel Santino, the leader of a group of South American bandits; who has been extorting protection money from the local villagers.
 Kevin Michael Richardson as General Aguila, the leader of Yaotl's four generals; his name is Spanish for "eagle".
 Paula Mattioli as General Serpiente, one of Yaotl's four generals; her name is Spanish for "snake".
 Fred Tatasciore as General Gato, one of Yaotl's four generals; his name is Spanish for "cat".

Production

Development
A computer-animated Teenage Mutant Ninja Turtles (TMNT) movie was first announced in 2000, with John Woo supposedly at the helm, with the project languishing in development hell and Woo ultimately moved on to other projects. TMNT, executive produced by the characters' co-creator Peter Laird, departs from the previous films' live action style and is the first CG animated film in the series. Writer/director Kevin Munroe said that he wanted to do total CGI instead of live action and CGI turtles because it would be easier for the audience to "suspend disbelief for such an offbeat story" as there would be no break in the reality between CGI and live action. Producer Tom Gray explained that the decision to depart from the live action series was due to escalating budgets for the three films, and with each film making less than its predecessor, a CGI film became a reality. For example, the first film made $135.2 million on a budget of $13.5 million, and the third made $44 million on a budget of $21 million. Orange Sky Golden Harvest's rights to the franchise had expired, and Gray said the question arose there over a CGI TMNT film in 2004.

Writing
Munroe stated in terms of the story line that ideas were floated as extreme as the Turtles being in space, but eventually it just came back to New York City, and the theme of the family that had fallen apart. When developing the screenplay, Munroe wanted to take on a less lighthearted tone or "less Cowabunga" and place an emphasis on dark elements as shown in the original comics to appeal to the mature audience: "I had a very specific tone because mixing that sort of action and comedy is a very specific thing. Most people were just coming and wanting to make it too funny. I think that version of the movie could do really well, but we wanted to do something where it sort of pushes the envelope a little bit more and says that animation is more than just comedic animals bumping into each other and farting!" 

Munroe said that in design and in the rendering of the animation, he was after the feel of a comic book. Karai was one of Munroe's favorite characters from the comics and he "was the one who really pushed for Karai" to appear in the film. TMNT co-creator Peter Laird stated it takes place in its own universe separate from the previous films, but director Munroe says the film exists in the same continuity as the other films, which was supported by the memento wall at the end of the film.

Animation
Development and pre-production for TMNT began in June 2005 at Imagi's Los Angeles facility and the CGI animation was produced in Hong Kong, followed by post-production in Hollywood. In designing the New York backdrop, art director/concept artist Simon Murton stylized the familiar Manhattan skyline and urban landscapes: "We began with cinematic cues from certain black-and-white films from the 1940s and '50s. I really wanted to push the lighting and the environments to create the look and feel of an alternate reality". 

The animators that worked on the fight sequences were inspired by Hong Kong action films. Animation director Kim Ooi explains said that because of CGI they were able to "push and stylize beyond the limits of live action." Imagi used Autodesk Maya with Pixar's RenderMan for the production pipeline's back-end.

Casting
Jim Cummings was the only past TMNT actor to appear in this film, where he had previously contributed voice-work in the 1987 Teenage Mutant Ninja Turtles series. The film also features three voice actors in the Ratchet & Clank series, Mikey Kelley and Kevin Michael Richardson from the first game, and James Arnold Taylor from the others, playing Michelangelo, General Aguila, and Leonardo, respectively. 

TMNT would be Mako Iwamatsu's final acting role. Mako was announced as the voice of Splinter at the San Diego Comic-Con on July 20, 2006. He then died the next day, aged 72. A dedication to Mako appears at the end of the film's credits. Although Mako is the only actor credited in the role, Greg Baldwin performs a substantial portion of Splinter's dialogue in the finished film; Baldwin had already mimicked Mako's voice when he took up the late actor's role as Iroh in the concurrently-produced animated series Avatar: The Last Airbender, and used this precedent to successfully lobby to join the cast of TMNT as Splinter following Mako's death.

Music

Soundtrack

The licensed soundtrack TMNT: Teenage Mutant Ninja Turtles was released by Atlantic Records in 2007.

Release

Marketing
At the 2006 San Diego Comic-Con, the TMNT panel screened an exclusive preview that contained a Splinter voice-over with facial tests, concept art, muscle and dynamic fight tests, and a few comedic scenes. A sneak peek booklet containing storyboards, environment designs and character designs by comic artist Jeff Matsuda was also distributed at the convention.

Several tie-in products were released in 2007. The McDonald's fast-food chain had the film-based toys to collect with the purchase of a Happy Meal. A series of action figures based in the film's characters was released by Playmates Toys. A novelization, adapted from Munroe's screenplay by Steve Murphy, was published by Simon Spotlight. A five-issue prequel comic miniseries was published by Mirage Comics.

The trailer was released in July 2006, and it was shown in front of The Ant Bully. The trailer was also shown in front of Unaccompanied Minors in December 2006.

Theatrical
TMNT was released theatrically in the United States on March 23, 2007, by Warner Bros. Pictures, and internernationally by The Weinstein Company. The film was originally set for release domestically (USA and Canada) on March 30, 2007, which would have been the 17th anniversary of the release of the first TMNT film. The March 30 date was advertised in the teaser trailer and early posters, but the release was moved up to March 23.

Home media
The film was released on DVD, HD DVD and Blu-ray on August 7, 2007. In 2009, a box set with all four TMNT films was released to celebrate the franchise's 25th anniversary.

Reception

Box office
TMNT ranked number one at the box office on its opening weekend, beating 300 (the top film of the previous two weeks), The Last Mimzy, Shooter, Pride, The Hills Have Eyes 2, and Reign Over Me. Weekend estimates showed that the film made $25.45 million over the weekend of March 23–25, 2007. The film grossed over $95 million worldwide, including over $54 million domestically during its 91-day run in the 3,120 North American theaters.

Critical response
The critical consensus states, "TMNT's art direction is splendid, but the plot is non-existent and the dialogue lacks the irony and goofy wit of the earlier TMNT movies." On Metacritic the film has a score of 41 out of 100 based on reviews from 21 critics, indicating "mixed or average reviews". Audiences polled by CinemaScore gave the film a grade "A−" on a scale from A+ to F.

Claudia Puig of USA Today gave a negative review, stating that the film "is trying for a new image. But it takes more than an awkward title attempting to sound cool to overcome its mundane plot and silly dialogue". Michael Ordona of the Los Angeles Times wrote that "despite the doll-like cartoonishness of the human figures, the filmmakers seem to expect us to take this animated romp seriously. Too seriously". Wesley Morris of the Boston Globe called the film "a junk-food pastry. The plot is the wrapper. The action is the oily sponge cake. And the message—family, family, family—is the processed cream filling".

Todd Gilchrist of IGN gave the film a positive review, calling it "a fun, action-filled adventure that will satisfy longtime fans and generate a legion of new ones, whether it be by virtue of simple storytelling, solid CGI, choreographed action, or just the spirit and energy that only the Turtles can create". 

Stephen Hunter of The Washington Post felt that the film "is technically superb and quite enjoyable as long as you don't bang your head against the plot, which will cause hot flashes, premature aging and fallen arches". 

According to Steven Rea of The Philadelphia Inquirer, the film is "not so dark or scary as to keep most kids away" and it "has a cool, noirish sheen. There's an attention to detail in the visuals and sound design that pushes it up several notches above most kiddie fare".

Accolades
At the 35th Annie Awards, TMNT received a nomination for Outstanding Storyboarding in a Feature Production (Sean Song). It was nominated for Best Comic Book Movie at the 2007 Scream Awards.

Video games 

Three beat'em up/action adventure game/platformer adaptations of the film were developed and released by Ubisoft in 2007 for a variety of video game consoles. A mobile game TMNT: The Power of 4 was also developed by Overloaded and released by uClick that same year. In addition, characters from the film are available in Ubisoft's 2009 Wii and PlayStation 2 fighting game Teenage Mutant Ninja Turtles: Smash-Up, while artworks from the film are available in this game as unlockable content.

Cancelled sequels 
In 2007, Munroe stated that he would like to direct a possible sequel to TMNT, possibly involving the return of the Shredder. Munroe planned a trilogy. TMNT 2 would have loosely adapted the Turtles’ 13-part comic book saga "City At War". Michelangelo would have felt rejected and joined the Foot Clan, while the Turtles would have traveled to Japan and would have crossed paths with Karai and Shredder. TMNT 3 would have featured the Triceratons as well as the Technodrome’s arrival from Dimension X. Munroe wanted Michael Clarke Duncan to voice the Triceraton's leader, Commander Mozar. YouTube commentator RebelTaxi noted that these sequels could not materialize due to Munroe leaving Imagi, layoffs in the studio, and Astro Boy (2009) being a box office bomb that ultimately led to Imagi's bankruptcy.  In an interview, Laird stated he was interested in the idea of having the next film be a live-action and CGI hybrid film, with the Turtles rendered in CGI and Sarah Michelle Gellar and Chris Evans reprising their TMNT roles in live-action. The live-action concept would later evolve into Teenage Mutant Ninja Turtles, an unrelated reboot released in 2014.

Notes

References

External links

 
 
 

 
2007 films
2000s English-language films
2000s action comedy films
2000s American animated films
2007 martial arts films
2000s science fiction comedy films
2000s superhero comedy films
2000s animated superhero films
2000s monster movies
2007 computer-animated films
American children's animated comic science fiction films
American children's animated science fantasy films
American children's animated superhero films
American science fiction action films
American vigilante films
Animated films based on comics
Animated films set in New York City
Animated Teenage Mutant Ninja Turtles films
Anime-influenced Western animation
Hong Kong science fiction action films
Demons in film
Films directed by Kevin Munroe
Films scored by Klaus Badelt
Films set in Central America
Films set in New York City
Ninja films
Warner Bros. films
Films about parallel universes
Warner Bros. animated films
The Weinstein Company films
The Weinstein Company animated films
Animated films about rats
2007 directorial debut films
2007 comedy films
2000s teen films
Animated films about brothers
Hong Kong vigilante films
Hong Kong animated films
Hong Kong martial arts films